Atlanta United FC, commonly known as Atlanta United, is an American professional soccer club based in Atlanta that competes in Major League Soccer (MLS) as a member of the league's Eastern Conference.

Founded in 2014, Atlanta United began play as an MLS expansion team in 2017, as the twenty-second team in the league. It is the first MLS franchise to be based in Atlanta, and the club plays home games at the Mercedes-Benz Stadium, which they share with the city's National Football League (NFL) franchise, the Atlanta Falcons. Both are owned by Arthur Blank, co-founder of The Home Depot. The club also owns Atlanta United 2, a reserve team that competes in MLS Next Pro.

Gerardo Martino was appointed as the club's first head coach and guided Atlanta to their first playoff appearance in the team's debut season, before securing the team's first trophy in just their second season by winning MLS Cup 2018.

Atlanta has set several league records for highest single-match and average attendance. In 2021, Sportico estimated the club was the second most valuable in the league, worth approximately $845 million.

History

Initial expansion proposals

At the time the team was announced, Atlanta was the largest metropolitan area without an MLS franchise. Atlanta Falcons owner Arthur Blank's AMB Sports and Entertainment Group had submitted a bid for an expansion franchise in 2008, but withdrew the bid in early 2009 due to state and local government budget shortfalls and Blank's inability to find partners to build an appropriate stadium for the proposed team. On July 10, 2010, Dan Courtemanche, MLS's executive vice president of communications, said that despite the bid withdrawal, regular discussions with Blank regarding Atlanta's potential as an expansion market were occurring.

MLS expansion bid

On May 31, 2011, the NHL's Atlanta Thrashers were sold to True North Sports & Entertainment, who announced that they would relocate the team to Winnipeg and rebrand as the Winnipeg Jets. The Thrashers' relocation helped restart the efforts and talks of bringing an MLS expansion team to Atlanta.

In May 2012, while the Falcons' proposed new stadium was going through the approval process, MLS commissioner Don Garber cited Atlanta as one of three "intriguing" markets for future league expansion. Additionally, when Blank presented his case for a new stadium at the Falcons' annual meeting with season ticket holders, he stated that an additional benefit of the new stadium was that it could help attract a Major League Soccer franchise and potentially host World Cup matches. Later that year, in November, Garber said if the Falcons could complete plans for a new stadium, MLS would "try to figure out how an MLS team could be part of their plans."

Rich McKay, Falcons president and CEO, said in 2013 that the team was "open to various options, including [its] ownership of a team or someone else owning a team". Dan Courtemanche said, "We are big believers in the Atlanta market," and cited the city's growing Hispanic population and corporations that could serve as its sponsors. Then, in March 2013, the city and the Falcons agreed to financing terms, and in May 2013, the Georgia Department of Economic Development board approved $30 million in bonds to finance the land purchase for the new stadium. The stadium was set to open in 2017 and could be configured for professional soccer. Atlanta remained at the top of the list for an MLS expansion team, as Garber, in the December 2013 MLS State of the League address, emphasized that it was a goal to continue to expand in the Southeast, and added, "if we can continue to advance our discussions positively with Arthur [Blank] and the [Atlanta] Falcons, we hope to be able to get a situation finalized so that could potentially be our second team. Orlando being the first, maybe Atlanta or Miami would be the second or the third." In December 2013, Garber said the league was making progress in discussions with the Falcons and that the stadium situation was finalized. Negotiations continued, as Courtemanche said in January 2014 that Atlanta "remains a great prospect for MLS expansion," and in February 2014, Rich McKay confirmed the parties were "far along in negotiations."

On April 16, 2014, Blank announced that MLS had awarded an expansion franchise to his group, and the team would begin play in 2017. Atlanta became the second franchise awarded in the Southeastern United States in five months, following the Orlando City SC announcement in late 2013. The Southeast had been without an MLS team since the Miami Fusion and Tampa Bay Mutiny were dissolved in 2001.

Inaugural season

Atlanta's first regular season MLS game was played on March 5, 2017, at Bobby Dodd Stadium with 55,297 in attendance. Yamil Asad scored the first goal in team history in a 2–1 loss to New York Red Bulls. A week later, the team registered its first win with a 6–1 away defeat of fellow expansion team Minnesota United FC. On March 18, 2017, the team registered its first win at home, beating Chicago Fire, who went down to ten men in the eleventh minute, 4–0 in front of a sold-out Bobby Dodd Stadium. Following its move to Mercedes-Benz Stadium, the team continued leading the league in attendance and averaged more than 48,000 in its home league matches, breaking records for attendance for a non-doubleheader MLS game and average single-season attendance for a U.S. soccer team. Atlanta clinched a berth in the playoffs, becoming the third MLS expansion team to do so in their inaugural season, by finishing tied for third place in the Eastern Conference; due to tiebreaking rules Atlanta was seeded fourth. In its first playoff game, the team faced Columbus Crew and set a then-MLS attendance record for a playoff game with 67,221 spectators in attendance. After 120 minutes of scoreless action, the match was decided by a penalty shoot-out, which Columbus won 3–1 to eliminate Atlanta.

Champions in two seasons

In their second season, Atlanta finished second in the Eastern Conference as well as the Supporters' Shield. The club qualified for the playoffs for the second year in a row, advancing to MLS Cup 2018 after beating New York City FC and New York Red Bulls. In the final on December 8, the team beat Portland Timbers, bringing the city of Atlanta its first major sports championship since MLB's Atlanta Braves won the 1995 World Series. The win qualified Atlanta for the 2019 CONCACAF Champions League, marking the first time Atlanta qualified for continental competition.

The win also allowed Martino, who had announced earlier in the season that he would not return for the 2019 campaign, to end his two-year tenure on a high note. Josef Martínez was named league MVP, while Martino was named Coach of the Year.

In the second edition of the Campeones Cup, Atlanta defeated Club América 3–2, winning the trophy and becoming the first club from United States to defeat a Mexican side in the cup match.

2019–present 

Martino left the club following their MLS Cup triumph in order to take over as manager of the Mexico national team. He was replaced by Frank de Boer. De Boer led the club to wins in both the U.S. Open Cup and Campeones Cup, but after beating the New England Revolution and Philadelphia Union in the MLS Playoffs, Atlanta United were eliminated in the conference finals by Toronto FC.

The 2020 season started brightly for United, with two wins in two matches before the season was postponed due to the COVID-19 pandemic. Following a nearly four-month layoff, United participated in the MLS is Back Tournament in Orlando, Florida, losing all three of their matches. Following their elimination from the MLS is Back Tournament, De Boer and Atlanta United mutually agreed to end his relationship with the club. He was replaced on an interim basis by Stephen Glass, who led the club following the resumption of league play in August.

At the end of 2020, former Argentina international defender Gabriel Heinze signed a two-year contract to be the next head coach.

During the offseason prior to the 2021 MLS season, Atlanta United brought in 9 new players including Santiago Sosa and veteran striker Lisandro López. On April 6, 2021, United played their first game of the 2021 season, beating Costa Rican side Alajuelense 1–0. The match marked the return of striker Josef Martínez, who had missed the entirety of the 2020 season due to a torn ACL.

On April 13, 2021, Atlanta United beat Costa Rican side Alajuelense 2–0 on aggregate to advance to the quarterfinals of the CONCACAF Champions League. In their largest home defeat to date, they lost the first leg of the quarterfinals to Philadelphia Union on April 27, 2021, by a score of 3–0.

On July 18, 2021, Atlanta United announced the firing of head coach Gabriel Heinze, after the team hit a club-record eight-game winless streak, with only two wins out of their first thirteen games of the 2021 MLS season.  Heinze's interim replacement was Atlanta United assistant coach Rob Valentino.

On August 12, 2021, former Mexican international and Seattle Sounders FC assistant coach Gonzalo Pineda was named the fourth permanent head coach in club history, with his first match away to D.C. United on August 21. Valentino remained with the club as an assistant coach.

On November 7, 2021, Atlanta United clinched a spot in the 2021 MLS Cup Playoffs after a 2–1 victory over FC Cincinnati at TQL Stadium.

Colors and badge

Arthur Blank stated that fans would be involved in choosing the name, logo and "a color scheme that'll work with the red and black with ... gold " (the colors used by the Falcons when they launched in 1966).

On June 25, 2015, Sports Illustrated reported that Atlanta's expansion team would be named Atlanta United FC. The official announcement of the team's name took place on July 7. Atlanta United president Darren Eales explained that the name was chosen based on a survey of the team's supporters and used words the supporters most positively related to the potential team. Eales also stated that the Founders' Group meeting would still be held on July 7 and the logo for the new team would be unveiled.

Symbols

The team's name, logo and colors were unveiled on July 7, 2015. The logo features a circle reminiscent of the city's seal and Olympic heritage with a bold "A" at the center of the circle. Behind the "A" are five black and red stripes representing the five pillars of the team: unity, determination, community, excellence, and innovation. The team's official colors are black (for strength and power), red (or "Victory Red," as the team calls it, for pride and passion), and gold (for a commitment to excellence). The team has become unofficially known as "The Five Stripes", which correlates to the five stripes on the team's inaugural home kits.

Kits
In February 2019, on the heels of the club's first MLS championship, Atlanta unveiled a new primary kit for the upcoming 2019 season. The new design is nicknamed "Star and Stripes" and was created by Adidas. Changes include a move from five thick stripes to nine thinner stripes on the front, red socks instead of black, and a gold star above the team crest.

In February 2021, Atlanta United announced a new primary kit for the 2021 season. The design is named the "BLVCK" kit and is United's first all-black kit.

Home

Away

Third

Kit sponsor

On July 12, 2016, the team announced American Family Insurance as its primary jersey sponsor for the first team. The terms and length of the contract were not disclosed. Truist is the official kit sponsor at the youth academy level. On February 4, 2020, the club announced that it had expanded its partnership with local healthcare provider Piedmont Healthcare. As part of the partnership expansion, Piedmont became the first team's sleeve sponsor and the main sponsor for the reserve team. Later, the team announced Truist Financial and NAPA as short and sleeve sponsors. On March 23, 2021, the team announced AT&T as its new sleeve sponsor.

Development system

Reserve team 

On November 14, 2017, Atlanta United announced that they would be launching a reserve team to compete in the United Soccer League, the second division of American soccer. Club president Darren Eales said that the new team was launched to "bridge the gap between our best in class academy and our First Team." The team, Atlanta United 2, began play in the Eastern Conference of what is now called USL Championship in the 2018 season.

Youth academy 

Atlanta United operate a youth academy that competes in the United States Soccer Development Academy. The academy began play in the 2016–2017 USSDA season and has seven youth teams: U-19, U-17, U-16, U-15, U-14, U-13 and U-12. Participation in the academy is free for all players and participants are eligible to be signed to the Atlanta United first team as a Homegrown Player. The club has signed six players to first-team contracts and three players to reserve team contracts since the academy launched.

In addition to its USSDA programs, the academy also operates a soccer development program to identify players playing for local youth clubs and promote them to the academy. The club also operates the Atlanta United Regional Development School, a pre-academy feeder program for players aged 8–14 to provide training and development for advanced local players and identify potential academy players, as well as the United Juniors Program, a special development program to provide supplemental development for U-12 players playing for other Atlanta-area youth clubs.

Stadium and team facilities

Home stadiums

Mercedes-Benz Stadium

Capacity and atmosphere

The club shares Mercedes-Benz Stadium with the NFL's Atlanta Falcons. The club typically curtains off the upper level of the stadium to create a more intimate atmosphere for soccer. For most games, Mercedes-Benz Stadium holds 42,500 people. The team used the curtains for six of nine home matches during the inaugural season. When expanded to full capacity, the stadium can hold 71,000 people, with standing room for at least 73,019 people (based on attendance at MLS Cup 2018—at the time, the largest single-match crowd in MLS history). To create a better match-day experience, stands are retractable to accommodate a larger field and allow better sight lines. When Atlanta was announced as an expansion team, Blank vowed, "There will never be an MLS game in Atlanta where NFL lines are shown on the field."

Construction delays

In January 2016, the opening of the stadium was delayed three months to June 2017. The team was originally scheduled to move into Mercedes-Benz Stadium on July 30, 2017; however, the complexity of the eight-panel retractable roof caused another delay in the stadium's opening. As the team could not use Bobby Dodd Stadium in August due to Georgia Tech having priority, the rivalry match against Orlando City was moved up one day from July 30 to 29, and two home fixtures originally scheduled to be held at Mercedes-Benz Stadium in August were moved to September. The team's first match in the stadium took place on September 10, 2017, against FC Dallas.

Training facilities and team headquarters

In August 2015, the club announced plans for training facilities, academy facilities, and sporting headquarters in Decatur. However, the results of an environmental and geotechnical feasibility study found that the site on Memorial Drive was unfeasible, and in November 2015 plans for the facility were canceled. Instead, the facility was built on a 33-acre plot on Franklin Gateway in Marietta. On April 11, 2017, the $60 million facility was opened, named the Children's Healthcare of Atlanta Training Ground. The facility includes a 30,000 square foot building that acts as the club's sporting headquarters and houses locker rooms for the first team, reserve team, and academy teams, a full-service dining hall, and sports science facilities including a gymnasium and two hydrotherapy plunge pools. The facility also includes six outdoor training fields, including a showcase field with a stand that can seat 2,500 spectators. On March 28, 2019, the Marietta City Council agreed to sell an additional  of land to the club to expand the training facilities as well as extend the lease on the existing facility on city-owned land by an additional five years.

Bobby Dodd Stadium

The first team played its home matches in the first half of the 2017 MLS season at Georgia Tech's Bobby Dodd Stadium due to delays in the construction of Mercedes-Benz Stadium. Although the club sought a balanced home-and-away schedule during their spell at Bobby Dodd Stadium, Atlanta United did not play any home matches from March 19 to April 29 to avoid conflicts with the Yellow Jackets' spring football scrimmages. According to club officials, the Georgia Dome was not considered a viable option to temporarily host the team, since delaying the Dome's planned demolition would have also delayed the completion of Mercedes-Benz Stadium.

Club culture

Supporters
Atlanta United has four officially recognized supporter groups: Terminus Legion, Resurgence, Footie Mob, and the Faction.

Terminus Legion is a supporter group that was created in March 2011 by graphic designer Matt Stigall, who wanted a way to show that Atlanta fans would support soccer despite the perception of the city as a "lazy sports town". The group was named after the name given to Atlanta when it was first settled, and its logo featuring a cow catcher and railroad ties reflect the city's history as a locomotive hub. In the days since the expansion team was awarded, its membership doubled to over 500, and in the time leading up to 2017, Stigall said the group would support "all Atlanta soccer" including the Atlanta Silverbacks of the NASL and at the grassroots level, and make road trips to rival Orlando City matches.

Footie Mob is a supporter group established in 2014, their name a take on Atlanta hip-hop group Goodie Mob. The group is known for pre-game tailgating and incorporating Atlanta's music culture into the supporter culture.

By December 2015, the supporters of the new MLS team had already pledged to purchase more than 29,000 season tickets. As of December 2017, the team had more than 36,000 season ticket holders.

All Stripes is an LGBT supporter group established in 2017.

In 2018, the Bleacher Report declared Atlanta the "Black Soccer Capital of America" due to the emerging presence of African-Americans supporting Atlanta United.

Attendance 

On September 12, 2017, Atlanta United announced that the team had sold more than 69,256 tickets for the September 16 match against Orlando City at Mercedes-Benz Stadium, breaking the league record for single-match attendance. The previous record of 69,255 tickets sold was held by LA Galaxy. The game's official attendance was 70,425, making Atlanta the first MLS team to surpass 70,000 in attendance for a non-doubleheader match.

On October 5, 2017, the team announced they had sold more than 70,456 tickets for the October 22 match against Toronto FC. This allowed the team to break both the record for highest average attendance in a season for MLS (held by Seattle Sounders), as well as the record for highest average attendance in a season for professional soccer in the United States, which was held by New York Cosmos. The game's official attendance was 71,874, which broke the MLS single-match attendance record for a second time. Atlanta finished the season with an average attendance of 48,200 for MLS regular season games, a number higher than that of multiple major clubs such as English sides Everton and Chelsea.

On March 11, 2018, the team broke the league single-match attendance record for the third time, selling 72,035 tickets for their 2018 season home opener against D.C. United.

On June 30, 2018, fans set another record with 71,932 in attendance, more than any other soccer game happening that day in the world, including the 2018 FIFA World Cup in Russia.

On July 15, 2018, the team again set the league single-match attendance record with 72,243 in attendance.

Atlanta broke the league record for average regular-season attendance again in 2018, breaking their 2017 record and becoming the first MLS team to average more than 50,000 in attendance with an average attendance of 53,002.

On December 8, 2018, Atlanta United won its first MLS Cup before a crowd of 73,019, the largest non-doubleheader crowd in league history.

On August 3, 2019, the team set another single-match attendance record, with 72,548 in attendance for their home matchup against the LA Galaxy.

Traditions

During their inaugural season, Atlanta United introduced a ritual called the Golden Spike in a nod to the city's railroad history. Prior to the game, players and supporters sign a large golden railroad spike, which is then marched into the stadium by supporters and hammered into a platform by a local VIP while the crowd chants "A-T-L!" Additionally, after each Atlanta United win, the player voted as the Man of the Match hammers a spike. Local celebrities that took part in the Golden Spike tradition during 2017 included hip hop artists 2 Chainz, Yung Joc, and Waka Flocka, as well as country musician Zac Brown, retired Atlanta Braves star Andruw Jones, and Atlanta basketball players Tiffany Hayes and Dennis Schröder. Atlanta native rap artist Archie Eversole also participated in the Golden Spike tradition and would later compose a rap anthem for the club entitled "United We Conquer." In 2018, notable celebrity participants included singer T-Pain, Dutch soccer legend Edgar Davids, Atlanta multi-sports star Brian Jordan, boxing legend Evander Holyfield and his son Elijah Holyfield, and rappers Jeezy, Killer Mike, and Big Boi. At MLS Cup 2018, owner Arthur Blank hammered the Spike. 2019 saw celebrities such as wrestling legend Ric Flair, Hollywood icon Ron Howard, hip hop group Goodie Mob, and basketball star Dikembe Mutombo participate in the tradition.

Ownership

Atlanta United FC's principal owner is Arthur Blank, co-founder of Home Depot. It is a component of AMB Sports & Entertainment, a subsidiary of the Blank Family of Businesses that also includes the NFL's Atlanta Falcons and Mercedes-Benz Stadium.

Players

Roster

Out on loan

Reserved numbers 
 
On February 10, 2017, Atlanta United announced that the number 17 would be reserved for the fans. The number marks the year of the team's first inaugural season in MLS. Atlanta United aims to recognize that from the very beginning, the fans, the city, and the people define the spirit and essence of this team.

On January 22, 2021, the club also reserved for the 2021 MLS season the number 44. Following the death of Hank Aaron, a National Baseball Hall of Fame inductee who played for the local MLB club from 1966 to 1974 at 86, Atlanta-area sports teams on the amateur and professional level agreed to retire Aaron's 44 regardless of sport as a tribute.

Broadcasting 
Rights to all Atlanta United FC first team matches not broadcast by MLS' national television partners were originally held by Bally Sports. Most of the team's games were televised by either Bally Sports South or Bally Sports Southeast, which also carried team programming. A small number of matches were broadcast on over-the-air television by WUPA in the event of scheduling conflicts with the two channels. Financial details of the deal were not disclosed.

Beginning in September 2020 (and for some services even earlier) as a result of negotiating issues with Sinclair Broadcast Group and streaming services FuboTV, Sling TV, YouTube TV. and Hulu Live TV, the ability for fans in the local Atlanta metro area and corresponding TV market to view Atlanta United games on regional sports networks became greatly reduced. This issue will be rectified when rights to every MLS game become exclusive to Apple TV+ in 2023, and local TV broadcasts are limited to WAGA and through its affiliated networks.

Kevin Egan served as the team's local television play-by-play announcer. Former MLS midfielder Maurice Edu was the color commentator and Jillian Sakovits served as the pre- and post-game show host and sideline reporter.

Radio rights are held by WZGC/92.9 The Game, with other Audacy stations being used as an overflow (including WSTR (FM)). Commentators are Mike Conti (play-by-play) and Jason Longshore (color). This will not change after the 2023 TV rights deal, as MLS does not enforce an internet streaming blackout with its radio partners.

Rights to Atlanta United 2 matches are held by ESPN as part of the USL's broadcast agreement. Games are streamed online on ESPN+ with Jon Nelson as the play-by-play announcer and Jason Longshore as color commentator.

Staff

Technical staff

Executive staff

President history
 Darren Eales : September 10, 2014 – August 24, 2022
 Garth Lagerway : November 22, 2022 – present

Head coach history

Honors

Continental trophies 
 Campeones Cup
 Champions   : 2019

Domestic trophies 
 MLS Cup
 Champions  : 2018
 U.S. Open Cup
 Champions  : 2019
 MLS Eastern Conference Championship
 Champions  : 2018

Records

Seasons 

This is a partial list of the last five seasons completed by Atlanta. For the full season-by-season history, see List of Atlanta United FC seasons.

1. Avg. attendance include statistics from league matches only.
2. Top goalscorer(s) includes all goals scored in League, MLS Cup Playoffs, U.S. Open Cup, MLS is Back Tournament, CONCACAF Champions League, FIFA Club World Cup, and other competitive continental matches.

International competitions

Goals

References

External links

 
Soccer clubs in Atlanta
Association football clubs established in 2014
Major League Soccer teams
2014 establishments in Georgia (U.S. state)
U.S. Open Cup winners